We Have to Marry Them Off (Greek: Prepei na ta pantrepsoume) is a 1953 Greek romantic comedy film directed by Mavrikios Novak and starring Jenny Roussea, Dionysis Milas and Marika Anthopoulou.

Cast
 Jenny Roussea as Lena  
 Dionysis Milas as Miltos 
 Marika Anthopoulou 
 Apostolos Avdis as Dr. Apostolidis  
 Popi Deligianni as Amalia  
 Spyros Kapsalis as Efthymis  
 Giorgos Loukakis as Mimis Marinopoulos  
 Nelli Marselou 
 Maria Mazaraki 
 Thodoros Moridis as Periklis  
 Andreas Moustras 
 Virginia Petimezaki as Mary Marinopoulou  
Dimos Starenios as Giakoumis

References

Bibliography
 Stathēs Balukos. Philmographia tou Hellēnikou kinēmatographou: 1914-1998. Aigokerōs, 1998.

External links
 

1953 films
1953 romantic comedy films
1950s Greek-language films
Greek romantic comedy films
Greek black-and-white films